The American Society of Biomechanics (ASB) is a scholarly society that focuses on biomechanics across a variety of academic fields. It was founded in 1977 by a group of scientists and clinicians. The ASB holds an annual conference as an arena to disseminate and learn about the most recent progress in the field, to distribute awards to recognize excellent work, and to engage in public outreach to expand the impact of its members.

Conferences 

The society hosts an annual conference that takes place in North America (usually USA). These conferences are periodically joint conferences held in conjunction with the International Society of Biomechanics (ISB), the North American Congress on Biomechanics (NACOB), and the World Congress of Biomechanics (WCB). The annual conference, when not partnered with another conference, receives around 700 to 800 abstract submissions per year, with attendees in approximately the same numbers. The first conference was held in 1977.

Often, work presented at these conferences achieves media attention due to the ‘public interest’ nature of the findings or that new devices are introduced there. Examples include:
 the effect of tablet reading on cervical spine posture; 
 the squeak of the basketball shoe;
 ‘underwear’ to address back-pain;
 recovery after exercise;
 exoskeleton boots for joint pain during exercise;
 how flamingos stand on one leg.

National Biomechanics Day 

The ASB is instrumental in promoting National Biomechanics Day (NBD), which has received international recognition.
In New Zealand, Massey University attracted NZ$48,000 of national funding
through the Unlocking Curious Minds programme to promote National Biomechanics Day, with the aim to engage 1,100 students from lower-decile schools in an experiential learning day focused on the science of biomechanics.

It was first held in 2016 on April 7, and consisted of ‘open house’ visits from middle and high school students to biomechanics research and teaching laboratories across the US.

In 2017, NBD was held on April 6. An estimated 7000+ number of high school students participated in events around USA and internationally
with significant media attention

International participation was recognised from Australia, Belgium, Brazil, Canada, England, Ireland, New Zealand, South Africa, and Taiwan.

Awards 

The society grants a number of annual awards both honouring individuals in the field, and honouring notable research projects. The most notable of these is the Borelli Award, which has been awarded annually since 1984 for outstanding career accomplishment in any field of biomechanics. Past winners include:

References 

Conferences in the United States
Biomechanics
Learned societies of the United States
1977 establishments in the United States